The climate of Antarctica is the coldest on Earth. The continent is also extremely dry (it is a desert), averaging  of precipitation per year. Snow rarely melts on most parts of the continent, and, after being compressed, becomes the glacier ice that makes up the ice sheet. Weather fronts rarely penetrate far into the continent, because of the katabatic winds. Most of Antarctica has an ice-cap climate (Köppen classification EF) with very cold, generally extremely dry weather.

Temperature
The highest temperature ever recorded on Antarctica was  recorded at Signy Research Station, Signy Island on 30 January 1982. 

For comparison, this is  colder than subliming dry ice (at sea level pressure).

Satellite measurements have identified even lower ground temperatures, with  having been observed at the cloud-free East Antarctic Plateau on 10 August 2010.

This unnamed part of the Antarctic plateau, between Dome A and Dome F, was measured on 10 August 2010, and the temperature was deduced from radiance measured by the Landsat 8 and other satellites. It was discovered during a National Snow and Ice Data Center review of stored data in December 2013 but revised by researchers on 25 June 2018.

Along the Antarctic Peninsula, temperatures as high as  have been recorded, though the summer temperature is below  most of the time. Severe low temperatures vary with latitude, elevation, and distance from the ocean. East Antarctica is colder than West Antarctica because of its higher elevation. The Antarctic Peninsula has the most moderate climate. Higher temperatures occur in January along the coast and average slightly below freezing.

Precipitation

Almost all Antarctic precipitation falls as snow. Rainfall is rare and mainly occurs during the summer in coastal areas and surrounding islands. Note that the quoted precipitation is a measure of its equivalence to water, rather than being the actual depth of snow. The air in Antarctica is also very dry. The low temperatures result in a very low absolute humidity, which means that dry skin and cracked lips are a continual problem for scientists and expeditioners working on the continent.

Weather condition classification

The weather in Antarctica can be highly variable, and the weather conditions can often change dramatically in short periods of time. There are various classifications for describing weather conditions in Antarctica; restrictions given to workers during the different conditions vary by station and nation.

Ice cover
Antarctica contains 90% of the world's ice and more than 70% of its fresh water. The Antarctic is so cold that even with increases of a few degrees, temperatures would generally remain below the melting point of ice. Higher temperatures are expected to lead to more precipitation, which takes the form of snow. This would increase the amount of ice in Antarctica, offsetting approximately one third of the expected sea level rise from thermal expansion of the oceans.
For the contribution of Antarctica to present and future sea level change, see sea level rise. Because ice flows, albeit slowly, the ice within the ice sheet is younger than the age of the sheet itself.

Ice shelves

About 75% of the coastline of Antarctica is ice shelf. The majority of ice shelf consists of floating ice, and a lesser amount consists of glaciers that move slowly from the land mass into the sea. Ice shelves lose mass through breakup of glacial ice (calving), or basal melting due to warm ocean water under the ice.

Melting or breakup of floating shelf ice does not directly affect global sea levels; however, ice shelves have a buttressing effect on the ice flow behind them. If ice shelves break up, the ice flow behind them may accelerate, resulting in increasing melt of the Antarctic ice sheet and an increasing contribution to sea level rise.

Known changes in coastline ice around the Antarctic Peninsula:
 1936–1989: Wordie Ice Shelf significantly reduced in size.
 1995: Ice in the Prince Gustav Channel disintegrated.
 Parts of the Larsen Ice Shelf broke up in recent decades.
 1995: The Larsen A ice shelf disintegrated in January 1995.
 2001:  of the Larsen B ice shelf disintegrated in February 2001. It had been gradually retreating before the breakup event.
 2015: A study concluded that the remaining Larsen B ice-shelf will disintegrate by the end of the decade, based on observations of faster flow and rapid thinning of glaciers in the area.

The George VI Ice Shelf, which may be on the brink of instability, has probably existed for approximately 8,000 years, after melting 1,500 years earlier. Warm ocean currents may have been the cause of the melting. Not only are the ice sheets losing mass, they are losing mass at an accelerating rate.

Climate change

See also
 Antarctic oscillation
 Antarctica cooling controversy
 Climate of the Arctic
 Effects of global warming
 Polar amplification
 Retreat of glaciers since 1850
 Southern Ocean

References
Notes

Sources

Further reading
Warm Snap Turned Antarctica Green Around the Edges; Thawed-out continent was lined with trees 15 million years ago, study says. 20 June 2012 National Geographic
Taking Antarctica's temperature; Frozen continent may not be immune to global warming 27 July 2013; Vol.184 #2 Science News

External links

Climate
 Temperature data from the READER project
 A pamphlet about the weather and climate of Antarctica
 Antarctica's central ice cap grows while glaciers melt
 
 Antarctica Climate and Weather

Climate change in Antarctica
Western Antarctica warming confirmed 23 December 2012 USA Today
NASA experts explain ice melt in Antarctica (2014)

Antarctic ice
 
 
 
 
 
 
 

 
Environment of Antarctica